E1000 may refer to:
Cholic acid
Epic E1000, an American turboprop aircraft design
E1000 series, a train used by the Taiwan Railways Administration